The 2019–20 season was Real Betis's 112th season in existence and the club's 5th consecutive season in the top flight of Spanish football. It covered a period from 1 July 2019 to 30 June 2020. Real Betis competed in La Liga and Copa del Rey.

Players

.

Reserve team

Out on loan

Transfers

In

Out

Pre-season and friendlies

Competitions

Overall

La Liga

League table

Results summary

Results by round

Matches
The La Liga schedule was announced on 4 July 2019.

Copa del Rey

Statistics

Appearances and goals
Last updated on the end of the season.

|-
! colspan=14 style=background:#dcdcdc; text-align:center|Goalkeepers

|-
! colspan=14 style=background:#dcdcdc; text-align:center|Defenders

|-
! colspan=14 style=background:#dcdcdc; text-align:center|Midfielders

|-
! colspan=14 style=background:#dcdcdc; text-align:center|Forwards

|-
! colspan=14 style=background:#dcdcdc; text-align:center| Players who have made an appearance or had a squad number this season but have left the club either permanently or on loan

|-
|}

Notes

References

Real Betis seasons
Real Betis